Mara Đorđević (born Marija Mišović; 31 January 1916 in Odobești, Romania – 22 January 2003 in Pančevo) was a Serbian singer of traditional songs.

References 
Saša Janoš, Marine kosovske pesme iz Pančeva, Pančevac no. 4244, Pančevo 8.5.2008

Mara Djordjević, Pesme sa Kosova i Metohije, a CD by PGP-RTS, 2000 (text in the booklet), available also on Riznica srpska

1916 births
2003 deaths
People from Odobești
Romanian emigrants
Yugoslav women singers
Immigrants to Yugoslavia